A sparse ruler is a ruler in which some of the distance marks may be missing.  More abstractly, a sparse ruler of length  with  marks is a sequence of integers  where .  The marks  and  correspond to the ends of the ruler.  In order to measure the distance , with  there must be marks  and  such that .

A complete sparse ruler allows one to measure any integer distance up to its full length.  A complete sparse ruler is called minimal if there is no complete sparse ruler of length  with  marks.  In other words, if any of the marks is removed one can no longer measure all of the distances, even if the marks could be rearranged.  A complete sparse ruler is called maximal if there is no complete sparse ruler of length  with  marks.  A sparse ruler is called optimal if it is both minimal and maximal.

This upper bound can be achieved only for 2, 3 or 4 marks. For larger numbers of marks, the difference between the optimal length and the bound grows gradually, and unevenly.

For example, for 6 marks the upper bound is 15, but the maximal length is 13.  There are 3 different configurations of sparse rulers of length 13 with 6 marks.  One is {0, 1, 2, 6, 10, 13}.  To measure a length of 7, say, with this ruler one would take the distance between the marks at 6 and 13.

A Golomb ruler is a sparse ruler that requires all of the differences  be distinct.  In general, a Golomb ruler with  marks will be considerably longer than an optimal sparse ruler with  marks, since  is a lower bound for the length of a Golomb ruler.  A long Golomb ruler will have gaps, that is, it will have distances which it cannot measure.  For example, the optimal Golomb ruler {0, 1, 4, 10, 12, 17} has length 17, but cannot measure lengths of 14 or 15.

Wichmann rulers 
Many optimal rulers are of the form  where  represents  segments of length .
1 segment of length 1, 
1 segment of length 2, 
1 segment of length 3, 
2 segments of length 7, 
2 segments of length 4, 
1 segment of length 1

That gives the ruler {0, 1, 3, 6, 13, 20, 24, 28, 29}. Note that not all Wichmann rulers are optimal and not all optimal rulers can be generated this way. None of the optimal rulers of length 1, 13, 17, 23 and 58 follow this pattern. That sequence ends with 58 if the Optimal Ruler Conjecture of Peter Luschny is correct. The conjecture is known to be true to length 213.

Asymptotics 

For every  let  be the smallest number of marks for a ruler of length . For example, . The asymptotic of the function  was studied by Erdos, Gal (1948) and continued by Leech (1956) who proved that the limit  exists and is lower and upper bounded by 

Much better upper bounds exist for -perfect rulers. For every number  let  be the smallest cardinality of an -perfect ruler. It is clear that . The asymptotics of the sequence  was studied by Redei, Renyi (1949) and then by Leech (1956) and Golay (1972). Due to their efforts the following upper and lower bounds were obtained: 

In 2020, Pegg proved by construction that  ≤ 1 for all lengths . If the Optimal Ruler Conjecture is true, then  for all , leading to the ″dark mills″ pattern when arranged in columns, OEIS A326499. None of the best known sparse rulers  are proven minimal as of Sep 2020.

Examples 

The following are examples of minimal sparse rulers. Optimal rulers are highlighted. When there are too many to list, not all are included. Mirror images are not shown.

Incomplete sparse rulers
A few incomplete rulers can fully measure up to a longer distance than an optimal sparse ruler with the same number of marks. The table below lists these rulers, up to rulers with 13 marks. Mirror images are not shown. Rulers that can fully measure up to a longer distance than any shorter ruler with the same number of marks are highlighted.

See also
 Gauge block
 Golomb ruler
 Perfect ruler

References 

 http://www.luschny.de/math/rulers/prulers.html
 http://oeis.org/wiki/User:Peter_Luschny/PerfectRulers
 http://www.iwriteiam.nl/Ha_sparse_rulers.html
 http://www.maa.org/editorial/mathgames/mathgames_11_15_04.html
 http://www.contestcen.com/scale.htm
 http://members.cox.net/wnmyers/sparse_rulers.txt

Number theory
Combinatorics
Length, distance, or range measuring devices